R. elegans may refer to:

Rallus elegans, the king rail, a waterbird species found in North America
Ramodatodes elegans, a beetle species
Raphitoma elegans, a sea snail species
Rasbora elegans, the twospot rasbora, a ray-finned fish species
Restrepia elegans, an orchid species
Rhabdoderma elegans, an extinct genus of coelacanth fish that lived in the Carboniferous
Rivetina elegans, a praying mantis species
Rhodoplanes elegans, a bacterial species
Rhopalomyces elegans, a common species of zygomycete fungus
Rondeletia elegans, a flowering plant species